Haketia (also written as Hakitia or Haquitía) is an endangered Jewish Romance language also known as Djudeo Spañol, Ladino Occidental, or Western Judaeo-Spanish. It was historically spoken by the North African Sephardim in the Moroccan cities of Tétouan, Tangier, Asilah, Larache, Chefchaouen, Ksar el-Kebir, and the Spanish towns of Ceuta and Melilla. Tetuani Ladino was also spoken in Oran, Algeria.
One of the distinctions between Ladino and Haketia (Haquetia) is that the latter incorporates Arabic.

Description
The language is a variety of Spanish that borrows heavily from Judeo-Moroccan Arabic. It evidently also contains a number of words of Hebrew origin and was originally written using Hebrew letters.

In some places it is written "Jaquetía" with the same pronunciation.

Haketia is considered to have influenced Llanito, the vernacular spoken in the British overseas territory of Gibraltar due to migration of Moroccan Jews.

Modern use
Haketia, unlike other varieties of Judaeo-Spanish, did not develop a literary tradition, so the language remained as a colloquial form of communication and was not used as a vehicle for formal education since in Spanish Morocco, Spanish was used, along with French, at the Alliance Israélite Universelle schools. Due to the influence of the Spanish and French conquests
and the large number of Jews from northern Morocco who emigrated to Venezuela, Spain and later Argentina, the language was levelled with modern Spanish, which has contributed greatly to its extinction. The  regularly publishes articles in Haketia in its magazine Maguen-Escudo. The language is also spoken in some communities in the Amazon areas of Brazil.

References

Bibliography

External links 
 List of articles written in Haketia at eSefarad.com
 Rodrigues-da-Cunha, Alvaro Fernando (2012): Narrativa na (língua judaico-marroquina) hakitía (Portuguese summary)

Jews and Judaism in Morocco
Judaeo-Spanish
Ceuta
Melilla